Samuel or Sam Locke may refer to:
 Samuel Locke (educator)
 Samuel Locke (politician)
 Sam Locke (screenwriter)
 Sam Locke (golfer)